I Muvrini is a Corsican folk music group, who sing traditional Corsican music in their native Corsican language.

History
The group was formed in the early 1980s by the brothers Jean-François Bernardini and Alain Bernardini both born in the village of Tagliu-Isulacciu in the north of Corsica. They are named after a species of wild sheep (mouflon) which live in the mountains of Corsica.

The Bernardini brothers were introduced to traditional Corsican music at an early age by their father, Ghjuliu, who was a well-known poet and singer. They recorded their first single with their father in collaboration with the group Canta u Populu Corsu. Ghjuliu Bernardini died in December 1977 and I Muvrinis first album, I Muvrini ... ti ringrazianu, which was released in 1979, was dedicated to their father's memory.

In 2000, I Muvrini joined up with Sting to record "Terre d'Oru".

Throughout their career they have promoted the Corsican language and culture, much like the work pioneered by Les Nouvelles Polyphonies corses.

Selected discography

Studio albums
 1979 - ...Ti ringrazianu
 1980 - Anu da vultà
 1981 - ...È campà quì
 1984 - Lacrime
 1985 - 85
 1986 - À l'encre rouge
 1988 - Pè l'amore di tè...
 1989 - Quorum
 1991 - À voce rivolta
 1993 - Noi
 1995 - Curagiu
 1998 - Leia
 2002 - Umani
 2005 - Alma
 2007 - I Muvrini et les 500 choristes
 2010 - Gioia
 2012 - Imaginà
 2015 - Invicta
 2016 - Pianetta
 2017 - Luciole
 2019 - Portu in core
 2022 - Piu forti

Compilation albums
 1998 - Sò
 2000 - Pulifunie
 2000 - A strada
 2013 - Best of (3 CDs)

Live albums
 1990 - In core
 1994 - Zenith 93
 1996 - Bercy 96
 2006 - ALMA 2005

Videos / DVDs
 I Muvrini at Bercy '96
 Giru FR3 
 Zenith '92
 Terra
 Alma 2005

Collaborations
 1999 - Άσε την εικόνα να μιλάει ("Let the Picture Speak") with Pyx Lax.

Awards and nominations

|-
| 1997
| I Muvrini à Bercy 
| Victoires de la Musique for Traditional Music Album of the Year
|
|-
| 2003
| Umani
|Victoires de la Musique for Traditional Music/World Music Album of the Year
|
|}

References

External links

I Muvrini official web site (in English)
Terracorsa, information on I Muvrini and Corsica (in English)
Curagiu, information (in French)

Corsican musical groups
French folk music groups